Benton is a town in, and the parish seat of, Bossier Parish, in the U.S. state of Louisiana. The population was 2,048 in 2020. The town is named for 19th century U.S. Senator Thomas Hart Benton, a Democrat from Missouri and an ally of U.S. President Andrew Jackson.

History

On April 3, 1999, a powerful F4 tornado roared through portions of the town killing six people and injuring 90. A mobile home park located south of town and homes near the Palmetto Country Club were devastated. Neighborhoods affected included Haymeadow Trailer Park, Palmetto Park/Palmetto Place (adjacent to the country club), Bay Hills, Woodlake South, Twin Lake Community, and many other newer lakefront homes located around Cypress Lake. The population of Benton lakefront area nearly doubled between 2004 and 2008.

Geography
Benton is located at  (32.694607, -93.740595).

Demographics

As of the 2020 United States census, there were 2,048 people, 850 households, and 516 families residing in the town.

Education 
Benton has six public schools: Benton Elementary School, Legacy Elementary School, Kingston Elementary, Benton Intermediate School, Benton Middle School, and Benton High School.

Notable people
Robert E. "Bob" Barton, state representative from Bossier Parish, 1996-2000
Walter O. Bigby, state representative and judge, graduated from Benton High School.
Billy Bretherton, Entomologist and co-owner of  Vexcon Inc, a pest control services company featured on the A&E series Billy the Exterminator.
Dewey E. Burchett, Jr., state court judge from 1988 to 2008, born in Shreveport but resided in Benton 
Jesse C. Deen, member of the Louisiana House of Representatives from Benton, 1972 to 1988
Larry Deen, sheriff of Bossier Parish from 1988 to 2012
Mike Johnson, Republican member of the United States Congress from the 4th Congressional District; constitutional attorney in Benton
J. A. W. Lowry, Bossier Parish politician in the late 19th century; died in Benton in 1899 
George Nattin, Jr., businessman and LSU Tigers basketball player, 1959-1962
Henry Warren Ogden, Virginia-born planter in Benton; former member of the United States House of Representatives for Louisiana's 4th congressional district and Speaker of the Louisiana House of Representatives
Ford E. Stinson, former state representative, was a Benton native.
Jeff R. Thompson, former state representative for Bossier Parish, 2012-2014; judge of Division B of the 26th Judicial District Court in Benton

References

Towns in Bossier Parish, Louisiana
Towns in Louisiana
Parish seats in Louisiana
Towns in Shreveport – Bossier City metropolitan area